OPN1MW2 is a duplication of the OPN1MW gene, which encodes the medium wavelength sensitive (MWS) photopsin. The gene duplication is present in about 50% of X-chromosomes, so is present in 50% of males and at least once 75% of females. It caused by the same mechanism that causes congenital red-green color blindness, the most common form of color blindness.

Gene Duplication

OPN1MW2 is a duplication of the OPN1MW gene arising from unequal homologous recombination. During this process, one of the X-chromosomes "donates" its OPN1MW gene to the other chromosome, resulting in:
 One chromosome without a OPN1MW gene, which carries protanopia
 One chromosome with two OPN1MW genes, although only the first gene in the chain (OPN1MW1) will generally be expressed and the second gene OPN1MW2 will remain unexpressed.

The only difference between the two genes is their position in the gene cluster. They are equal in that they have the same chances of encoding a certain OPN1MW allele. However, in a given X-chromosome, they may encode different alleles.

Tetrachromacy
There are several theories for tetrachromacy in humans, but the most popular theory is related to females carriers of color blindness. Carriers will have one opsin gene (OPN1MW or OPN1LW) with differing alleles thereof on each chromosome, such that the alleles encode proteins with different spectral sensitivities. Both of these alleles are expressed due to x-inactivation, so a carrier will have 4 distinct cones with different spectral sensitivities, which is one prerequisite of tetrachromacy.

This theory cannot be extended to females who have identical alleles in their OPN1MW1 genes, but a different allele in their OPN1MW2 gene, since the latter is never expressed, and if it were co-expressed with OPN1MW1, the two alleles would not be isolated in different photoreceptors. Therefore the OPN1MW2 gene is not considered a likely candidate mechanism for tetrachromacy.

References

Color vision